David "Shark" Fralick (born October 16, 1962) is an American actor who portrayed the recurring character of Larry Warton on The Young and the Restless from 1995 to 1996 and again from 1999 to 2005. He played the title character in the 1996 horror film Uncle Sam. He performed as 'Graffiti' in the 2000 film Lockdown. He starred alongside Nicolas Cage in the 2000 remake of Gone in 60 Seconds and alongside Jean-Claude Van Damme in Desert Heat.

Fralick was born in Coral Gables, Florida.

Filmography

Television

References

External links 

1962 births
American male film actors
American male soap opera actors
Living people
Actors from Coral Gables, Florida